was the 11th daimyō of Shōnai Domain during Bakumatsu period Japan. His courtesy title was Saemon-no-jō.

Biography
Sakai Tadazumi was the fifth son of Sakai Tadaaki, the 5th daimyō of Shōnai. When his elder brother, the 10th daimyō of Shōnai Sakai Tadatomo died with heir, he was named successor posthumously in 1862 and his position was officially confirmed by the shogunate in 1863. A couple of months later, he was appointed the commander of the Shinchōgumi and elite paramilitary force of Rōshigumi who were created to provide extra security for the city of Edo. In 1864, Tagawa and Yuri districts in Dewa Province were added to his domains, raising his kokudaka by 27,000 koku to 170,000 koku. However, in 1867 growing dissatisfaction over high taxation and a severe crop failure led to widespread rioting and unrest in Shōnai Domain. Tadazumi remained in Edo, largely leaving affairs of the domain to his karō and other retainers. He led the Shinchōgumi in an arson attack which burned the Edo residence of Satsuma Domain at the end of 1866. In 1868, during the Boshin War, Shōnai Domain became a key member of the pro-Tokugawa  Ōuetsu Reppan Dōmei. In the early stages of the conflict, Shōnai forces won several key military engagements against Akita Domain and Shinjō Domain; however, towards the end of the year it became clear to Tadazumi that the pro-Tokugawa cause was ultimately doomed. Although the domain had not suffered any military defeat, he surrendered to the Meiji government at the end of the year.

Accused by the new government of treason, Tadazumi was forced into retirement in favor of his adopted son, and  the domain was reduced to 120,000 koku. In 1869 he was pardoned, and in 1870 was sent to Satsuma for military training, returning to a post in the Ministry of the Army in 1871. In 1872, he was commissioned as a lieutenant in the fledgling Imperial Japanese Army and was sent to Germany for training in April of that year. He returned to Japan in June 1879. In 1880, Sakai Masamichi retired, and Tadazumi resumed the position of chieftain of the Tsuruoka Sakai clan. He returned to Tsuruoka in 1881. In 1884, he became a Count (hakushaku) in the new kazoku peerage.

References 

Papinot, Edmond. (1906) Dictionnaire d'histoire et de géographie du japon. Tokyo: Librarie Sansaisha...Click link for digitized 1906 Nobiliaire du japon (2003)
  
 The content of much of this article was derived from that of the corresponding article on Japanese Wikipedia.

1856 births
1905 deaths
Fudai daimyo
Kazoku
People of the Boshin War
Imperial Japanese Army officers
Sakai clan